The following is a list of all incorporated communities in the state of Missouri. There are 958 municipalities.

References

 
Missouri, List of cities in
Municipalities